Boys & Girls Music Countdown was a South Korean music television program broadcast by Mnet. It aired from 2007 to 2010 every Mondays to Fridays at 17:00 KST to 18:00 KST.

Past MC

References 

Mnet (TV channel) original programming
South Korean music television shows
Korean-language television shows